Minimundus is a miniature park in Klagenfurt in Carinthia, Austria. It displays over 150 miniature models of architecture from around the world, built at a ratio of 1:25.

History
Since its opening in 1958, more than 15 million visitors have visited the 26,000 square meters park. The proceeds benefit the children's help organization Rettet das Kind ("Save the Child"), which owns the park.

Models
A small selection of the models:
 St. Stephen's Cathedral
 Statue of Liberty
 Saint Peter's Basilica
 Cathedral of Brasília
 Toronto CN Tower
 Eiffel Tower
 Hochosterwitz Castle in Austria
 Sydney Opera House
 Tower of London
 White House
 Taj Mahal 
 Baiturrahman Grand Mosque
 Castillo de Coca
 Atomium 
 Many trains of Europe
 The Space Shuttle and its launch pad
Most of the models are transportable and are moved to other areas during off-season winter.

See also 
 Madurodam
 Mini-Europe
 Window of the World

Gallery

References

External links

 Minimundus website

1958 establishments in Austria
Miniature parks
Klagenfurt
Amusement parks in Austria
Tourist attractions in Carinthia (state)
Buildings and structures in Carinthia (state)
Amusement parks opened in 1958
20th-century architecture in Austria